The 2019 Giants Live World Tour Finals was a strongman competition that took place in Manchester, England on 7 September 2019 at the Manchester Arena. This event was the finale of the 2019 Giants live tour.

Results of events

Event 1: Axle deadlift for repetitions
An axle deadlift bar is larger in diameter to a conventional bar.

Event 2: Circus dumbbell for repetitions

Event 3: Car Walk
  car walk over a  course.

Event 4: Hercules Hold
 Athlete must stand between and hold on to  pillars for as long as possible.

Event 5: Atlas Stones

Final Results

Notes 
This time was a new world record breaking the previous held by Laurence Shahlaei. 
This time was a new world record breaking the previous record held by Mark Felix himself.

References

Giants Live competitions
Competitions in the United Kingdom